Ladislav Boháč (14 April 1907 – 4 July 1978) was a Czechoslovak film actor. He appeared in more than 45 films between 1933 and 1977.

Selected filmography
 Morality Above All Else (1937)
 Skeleton on Horseback (1937)
 Lidé na kře (1937)
 Virginity (1937)
 Filosofská historie (1937)
 Jiný vzduch (1939)
 Humoreska (1939)
 Second Tour (1940)
 Rozina, the Love Child (1945)
 Saturday (1945)
 Getting on in the World (1948)
 Temno (1950)

References

External links
 
Ladislav Boháč on Filmová databáze (Film database)
Ladislav Boháč on Česko-Slovenská filmová databáze (Czechoslovak film database)

1907 births
1978 deaths
Czech male film actors
Czech male stage actors
People from Uherský Brod
20th-century Czech male actors